Ulu-Karamaly (Olo Qaramalı) is a rural locality (a village) in Lemezinsky Selsoviet, Iglinsky District, Bashkortostan, Russia. The population was 175 as of 2010. There are 3 streets.

Geography 
Ulu-Karamaly is located 57 km east of Iglino (the district's administrative centre) by road. Tashly-Yelga is the nearest rural locality.

References 

Rural localities in Iglinsky District